Weston is a city in Broward County, Florida, United States, just west of Fort Lauderdale. It is part of the Miami metropolitan area, which is anchored by Miami. The population was 68,107 at the 2020 census. Weston is 30 miles northwest of Miami, FL

History 
In the following years, plans were made to develop the land, and the area which is known as Bonaventure was sold and subsequently developed independently from the Arvida development; this area forms Weston's Bonaventure Development District. The large, remaining portion of the master-planned community was developed by Arvida/JMB Realty (known for developing Walt Disney World), and the community was originally named Indian Trace; the area developed by Arvida forms Weston's Indian Trace Development District.

The community's name of Indian Trace was changed to Weston in the early 1980s, and in 1984, the first homes in the Arvida-developed section of Weston were completed in the Country Isles and Windmill Ranch sections of the community.

In 1994, the Board of Supervisors of Weston began discussing the possibility of either incorporating as a municipality, being annexed into a neighboring municipality, or remaining an unincorporated area of Broward County. In April 1994, the Board of Supervisors initiated an Incorporation Feasibility Study, and a nine-member Steering committee consisting of residents and consultants was established by the Board.

By November 1995, after ruling out remaining an unincorporated area or being annexed to the neighboring municipalities of Davie, Fort Lauderdale, Pembroke Pines, or Sunrise (all four of which received Requests for Proposals on the matter from the Board of Supervisors), it was concluded by both the Board of Supervisors and the Steering Committee that the best option was for Weston to incorporate itself as a city. This was determined to be the best option because the community would be able to govern itself on a local level through home rule, and because the local tax revenues generated by the residents would stay in Weston, remain in Weston's control, and be used by and for Weston. Shortly thereafter, the Board of Supervisors formally requested to the State of Florida to let the Indian Trace Development District's residents vote on whether or not their district should incorporate as a city.

On May 6, 1996, the State Legislature approved the Local Bill, and a vote on the matter was subsequently scheduled for that summer. Weston ultimately incorporated itself as a city on September 3, 1996. Roughly 90% of the voters in voted in favor of incorporation.

The Bonaventure section was given the choice of becoming a part of Weston or a part of the City of Sunrise, located adjacent to Weston, as part of the Local Bill. On April 1, 1997, by a nearly two-to-one margin, the voters residing in the Bonaventure area voted in favor of becoming part of the City of Weston.

Geography

Weston is bordered by Sunrise to the northeast, Davie to the east, Southwest Ranches to the south, and the Everglades to the north and west. It is the most western city in Broward County, and the entirety of its western edge is located next to the Everglades.

Weston consists of two development districts: the Bonaventure Development District and the Indian trace Development District.

Climate 
Weston has a tropical rainforest climate (Af). Winters are usually dry and warm during La Niña conditions, while El Niño conditions usually bring cool and wet conditions to the region. ENSO effects on South Florida are rather minimal during the summer months, with the exception of tropical cyclone activity in the Atlantic Basin.

Economy
Companies with operations in Weston include Ultimate Software, DHL, Marriott International, Abbott Laboratories, Mondelez, Cleveland Clinic, Wendy's, Caribbean, Rockwell Automation, American Express, and Rick Case Autos.

Demographics

2020 census

As of the 2020 United States census, there were 68,107 people, 20,420 households, and 18,162 families residing in the city.

2010 census

As of the 2010 United States census, there were 24,394 households, with 13.0% being vacant. In 2000, there were 16,576 households, out of which 51.3% had children under the age of 18 living with them, 71.0% were married couples living together, 9.0% had a female householder with no husband present and 17.6% were non-families. 13.8% of all households were made up of individuals, and 3.3% had someone living alone who was 65 years of age or older.  The average household size was 2.97 and the average family size was 3.29.

According to a 2010 estimate, the median income for a household in the city was $93,553  and the median per capita income was $40,432. Males had a median income of $63,135 versus $38,119 for females. 2.3% of the population was below the poverty line. Out of the total population, 0.8% of those under the age of 18 and 8.2% of those 65 and older were living below the poverty line.

In 2000, the age distribution of the city was as follows: 32.4% were under the age of 18, 5.0% from 18 to 24, 36.1% from 25 to 44, 19.8% from 45 to 64 and 6.7% who were 65 years of age or older.  The median age was 34 years.  For every 100 females, there were 94.1 males.  For every 100 females age 18 and over there were 90.2 males.

In 2000, English was the sole language spoken at home by 62.5% of the residents, while Spanish speakers comprised 31.40% of the population, Portuguese speakers comprised 1.3% of the population, and French speakers 0.82%.

As of 2010, Weston had the highest number and highest percentage of Venezuelans in the United States, at 9.4% of the city's residents, the fourteenth highest percentage of Colombian residents in the US, at 6.19% of the city's population,
seventy-fifth highest percentage of Cubans, at 4.05% of Weston residents, and had the forty-seventh highest percentage of Peruvians in the US, with 1.19% of the population (tied with Orange, New Jersey). Also, Puerto Ricans, made up 4.1% of residents.

Government

City government 
As of January 2022, the Mayor of Weston is Margaret "Peggy" Brown and the City Commissioners are Chris Eddy, Byron L. Jaffe, Henry Mead, and Mary Molina-Macfie.

Representation in higher government

State representation

Florida State House 

Weston is located in the Florida State House's 104th district, which as of January 2022 is represented in the Florida State House of Representatives by Robin Bartleman (D–Weston).

Additionally, Bartleman had previously served as a City Commissioner of Weston, serving in that capacity between 2000 and 2004.

Florida State Senate 
Weston is located in the Florida State Senate's 32nd district, which as of January 2022 is represented in the Florida State Senate by Lauren F. Book (D–Plantation).

Federal representation

United States Congress 
As of January 2022, Weston is represented in the United States Congress by Debbie Wasserman Schultz (D–Weston).

United States Senate 
Like the rest of Florida, Weston is represented in the United States Senate as of January 2022 by Marco Rubio (R–Miami) and Rick Scott (R–Naples).

Sports 
The City of Weston contracts with the Weston Sports Alliance, Inc., the City's own all volunteer organization to manage and oversee its organized athletic league programs. The alliance is formed by six charter organizations: baseball/softball/t-ball, basketball, football, soccer, lacrosse and rugby, with roughly 9,000 participants annually.

The Weston FC, based in Weston, is Florida's largest soccer club and is one of the largest in the United States.

On October 16–18, 2013, Weston hosted the World Hardcourt Bike Polo Championship.

Parks and recreation

Parks 

The City of Weston maintains a total of 15 parks and recreational facilities throughout the city, which are maintained by the City of Weston Department of Parks and Recreation.

It is the home of the Weston Hawks.

The other public parks maintained and operated by the City of Weston are Bonaventure Park, Country Isles Park, Eagle Point Park, Emerald Estates Park, Gator Run Park, Heron Park, Indian Trace Park, Peace Mound Park, Tequesta Trace Park, Vista Park, Weston Library Park, the Weston Racquet Club, Weston Town Center Park, and Windmill Ranch Park.

Bicycle paths 
As aforementioned, the City of Weston maintains a large network of bicycle lanes and paths.

Country clubs 
Weston is home to two country clubs: the Weston Hills Country Club and the Bonaventure Golf Club.

Infrastructure

Roads

Federal roads 

Weston is served by the following federal highways:
Interstate 75 – Travels north-to-south along the eastern edge of the city, and east-to-west along the northern edge of the city as "Alligator Alley."
U.S. Highway 27 – Travels north-to-south through the western fringes of the city.
Additionally, Interstate 595's western terminus is at the Weston-Sunrise-Davie tripoint.

State roads 
Weston is served by the following state roads:

 State Road 84 – Travels east-to-west through the city as the service road for Interstate 75 and forms Weston's northern border.

Additionally, Griffin Road (State Road 818) serves the city and parallels its southern border.

Other roads 
Other major roads in Weston include Blatt Boulevard, Bonaventure Boulevard, Glades Parkway, Indian Trace, Racquet Club Road, Royal Palm Boulevard, Saddle Club Road, South Post Road, and Weston Road.

Public transit

Bus 
The city is served by bus routes of Broward County Transit.

Bicycle routes 

The City of Weston maintains a large network of bicycle lanes and paths across the city.

Education

Public schools
Broward County Public Schools operates the public schools in Weston.

Elementary schools 
The following elementary schools are located within and serve Weston:
Country Isles Elementary School
Eagle Point Elementary School
Everglades Elementary School
Gator Run Elementary School
Indian Trace Elementary School
Manatee Bay Elementary School

Middle schools 
The following middle schools are located within and serve Weston:
Falcon Cove Middle School
Tequesta Trace Middle School

High schools 

Cypress Bay High School is located within and serves the majority of Weston. However, small portions of the city are zoned to Western High School, located in adjacent Davie.

Private schools
The following private schools are located within Weston:
 Sagemont School
 Weston Christian Academy
 Xceed Preparatory Academy

Charter schools
One charter school is located within the city: the Imagine Charter School at Weston.

Higher education
Broward College has a small campus on the second floor of the Broward County Public Library – Weston Branch.

Additionally, the American InterContinental University South Florida Campus was located in Weston until closing in 2015.

Libraries 
Weston is served by the Weston Branch Library, which is located on Bonaventure Boulevard. The library is a branch of the Broward County Library.

Weston Town Center

Weston Town Center is a major shopping center located on the corner of Royal Palm Boulevard and Bonaventure Boulevard.

The initial construction of Weston Town Center began in November 1999. This 32-acre (13 ha) project cost $42 million. Apart from boutique and dining, this center of town has a bell tower, the Weston Town Center Park (a 1.2-mile park hugging the lake), and an outdoor amphitheater to host city events.

In 2011, the city approved plans to expand the northwest  corner of the retail center to accommodate a new urgent care facility, which is now Baptist Health Urgent Care.

Landmarks 
An 8,000-year-old paleo-Indian and Tequesta burial mound is located in Weston.

Notable people

 Nina Ansaroff, Mixed martial artist
 Robin Bartleman, Florida State Congresswoman and a former Weston City Commissioner
 Alan Cohen, Former owner of the NHL's Florida Panthers
 Daniel Dickey, Comedian, humorist and political activist
 Sami Gayle, Television and theater actress best known for her role on the CBS series Blue Bloods
 Art Ginsburg, "Mr. Food" cookbook author and television personality
 Jake Miller, Hip-hop recording artist
 Billy Mitchell, Recognized "Video Game Player of the Century," restaurateur
 Dean Pelman, Israeli-American baseball pitcher for the Israel National Baseball Team
 Carlos PenaVega, Actor/musician
 María Luisa Piraquive, Preacher, singer
 Manny Ramirez, Professional baseball player for the EDA Rhinos
 Debbie Wasserman Schultz, U.S. Representative

See also 

 Westlake, Florida – Another planned community in South Florida, named in part as a nod to Weston.

References

External links

Official website 
Weston Chamber of Commerce 

 
Cities in Broward County, Florida
Venezuelan American
Cities in Florida
Planned communities in Florida
1996 establishments in Florida
Populated places established in 1996